Geoffrey William Rickly (born March 8, 1979) is an American musician, best known as the lead singer and songwriter of rock band Thursday. Rickly is also a member of hardcore punk band United Nations, and the alternative rock group No Devotion with former members of Lostprophets, and is the founder of the record label Collect Records.

Personal life
Rickly was born in Providence, Rhode Island and raised in Dumont, New Jersey, into a Catholic family, and attended Dumont High School, where he was a member of the band and played the tenor sax. He was raised Catholic, Rickly is a diagnosed epileptic, which has affected his ability to tour.

In early 2013, Rickly was mugged in New York City, where his cell phone, iPad, wallet, credit card, rent money, and medication were stolen. In 2015, Rickly was poisoned and robbed in Hamburg, Germany, while touring with No Devotion to play at the Reeperbahn Festival. Rickly was hospitalized, causing them to cancel their concert, but recovered for a scheduled show in Paris the following day.

In a 2017 interview with Spin, Rickly admitted to battling a heroin addiction that began shortly after Thursday's breakup in 2011. Following Thursday's reunion in 2016, Rickly was inspired to quit using the drug.

Musical career
Rickly has contributed guest vocals to many songs, including My American Heart's "We Are the Fabrication", Murder by Death's "Killbot 2000", This Day Forward's "Sunfalls and Watershine", Circa Survive's "The Lottery", and My Chemical Romance's "This Is the Best Day Ever". He also occasionally performs solo, most recently in Hoboken, New Jersey, at the Eyeball Records holiday party, performing his band, Thursday songs "Autumn Leaves Revisited" and "This Side of Brightness" acoustically.

Lyrically, Rickly has been known to draw from a wide variety of influences, many of them being authors and poets. In a March 2009 interview, he cited the works of Denis Johnson, Martin Amis, Roberto Bolaño and David Foster Wallace as being among his influences for the lyrics of Thursday's Common Existence album, which was released in February 2009. A tattoo on his forearm  reads "love is love", a lyric from the band Frail; Rickly adopted these lyrics into Thursday's "A Hole in the World." The band's song, "Autobiography Of A Nation" is clearly influenced by poet Michael Palmer's "Sun." Rickly has also written, recorded and played for United Nations, an experimental powerviolence collaboration.

Collect Records
In 2009, Rickly formed Collect Records, a record label which in its early years only co-released various albums, including releases by Touché Amoré, United Nations and Midnight Masses, but in 2014, the label announced plans to be the primary label behind albums by Black Clouds, Vanishing Life, Sick Feeling and No Devotion, the new band formed by the ex members of Lostprophets, featuring Rickly on lead vocals.

Martin Shkreli controversy
During the 2015 public scandal of hedge fund manager Martin Shkreli and his controversial monetary inflation of toxoplasmosis-related pharmaceuticals, it was revealed that Shkreli was a silent investor in Collect Records, while still allowing Rickly to retain creative control. Rickly and Shkreli met when the guitar that Rickly used to make Thursday's album Full Collapse was purchased by Shkreli for $10,000. Rickly said he was completely shocked by the scandal, stating: "I've seen the guy give away money to schools, charities, and frankly, our bands, who if anyone really knows the industry, is a hard sell. I am struggling to find how this is OK." Due to the controversy, Shkreli's relationship with Collect Records angered several artists signed to the label. One of the artists, Sick Feeling, said in a public statement: "One thing is clear; as long as he has a part in the label, we, Sick Feeling, cannot. Our experience with Geoff, Norm, and Shaun has been nothing but positive, however, we cannot continue to work with Collect as long as Martin Shkreli has any part in it." Dominic "Nicky" Palermo of Nothing, who had just recently signed a two-record deal with Collect Records, expressed interest in ending the contract and said: "I'm hoping that we can just get out of this with someone else and not have to go down whatever ugly road that could lead to." Within two days of the controversy, Rickly put out a press release stating that the label had severed its relationship with Shkreli, and that the amount of money he currently had in the bank could not cover Collect Records' outstanding invoices, leaving its future uncertain, without Shkreli's significant financial contributions to Collect (estimated to be "somewhere around a million dollars").

Discography

As band member

Thursday

 Waiting (1999, Eyeball)
 Full Collapse (2001, Victory)
 Five Stories Falling (2002, Victory)
 War All the Time (2003, Island)
 Live from the SoHo & Santa Monica Stores (2003, Island)
 Live in Detroit (2003, Island)
 A City by the Light Divided (2006, Island)
 Kill the House Lights (2007, Victory)
 Thursday / Envy (2008, Temporary Residence)
 Common Existence (2009, Epitaph)
 No Devolución (2011, Epitaph)

United Nations
 United Nations (2008, Eyeball)
 Never Mind the Bombings, Here's Your Six Figures (2010, Deathwish)
 The Next Four Years (2014, Temporary Residence)

Solo
 Mixtape 1 (2012, self released)
 Darker Matter/// Mixtape 2 (2013, self-released)

Strangelight
 9 Days (2013, Sacrament)

No Devotion
 Permanence (2015, Collect)
 No Oblivion'' (2022, Velocity)

As guest member

As producer/engineer

References

External links
Geoff Rickly on Bandcamp
Geoff Rickly Community on Buzznet
Collect Records

1979 births
Living people
American rock singers
American male singer-songwriters
Record producers from New Jersey
Singer-songwriters from New Jersey
Catholics from New Jersey
Dumont High School alumni
People from Dumont, New Jersey
People with epilepsy
Rutgers University alumni
21st-century American singers
21st-century American male singers
United Nations (band) members
No Devotion members